Lavon Dam is located in Collin County, Texas on the East Fork of the Trinity River, about 3 miles east of Wylie and 22 miles northeast of Dallas. It was constructed to create the Lavon Lake and is named after the town of Lavon. Dams are generally named after the closest town near the structure.

History
Construction on the Lavon Dam began in January, 1948, and was completed in March, 1953. Deliberate impoundment began on September 14, 1953. The cost of the project was $18,554,570. On May 15, 1970, construction began on a modification of Lavon Dam that increased the conservation storage pool from elevation 472.0 feet to the current elevation of 492.0 feet by raising the top of the dam 12 feet. The modification was completed and deliberate impoundment began December 1, 1975. The cost of the modification was $69,796,678, which brought the grand total cost to $88,351,248.

References

External links
 TopoQuest
 TX HomeTownLocator

Dams in Texas
United States Army Corps of Engineers dams
Dams completed in 1953
Earth-filled dams
Buildings and structures in Collin County, Texas